Davit "Data" Kajaia (born 10 January 1984 in Tbilisi) is a Georgian racing driver, best known for winning the Legends Euro Nations Cup in 2012 and 2013. He currently drives for the MIA Force team in the Georgian Circuit Championship.

Career

Data Kajaia started his career in the Georgian Speed Slalom series in 2004. The next season, he achieved third place at the wheel of BMW M3, and won the national title a year later. 
In 2007 Kajaia entered the national circuit racing series and finished third in the championship, driving a Honda Civic 1600. On the same car he came third overall in the national rally series. In 2010 and 2011 he dominated in Georgian pair racing championship. After the reconstruction of the only Georgian race track Rustavi in 2011 Kajaia joined one of a newly established national teams, the MIA Force, sponsored by the national Ministry of Internal Affairs and won his first Legends race after a closely fought battle with more experienced rivals from Russia. 
In 2012, Kajaia continued driving in the Georgian Legends championship and also contested Europe Nations Cup of the same category. He finished second in the homeland series and won the Europe cup. In 2013 he took the national title, still dominating in Europe, and was awarded by the minister of internal affairs Irakli Garibashvili.

In 2014, Kajaia continued in domestic championship and also won European Legends SuperCup.

In 2015 Kajaia entered the European Touring Car Cup series (ETCC) with the TC2T class BMW 320 Engstler team. During the first race of the opening round on Hungaroring Kajaia was on his way to a shock win against the dominant Seat Leon Cup class cars in his inferior BMW but a mistake on a last lap relegated him to second overall. Nevertheless, Kajaia won in his TC2T class convincingly in both races. During the second round on Slovakiaring Kajaia also won both races in TC2T class and came second overall in a second race, beating all but one Seat Leon Cup cars. Kajaia also scored the fastest lap of the race. Kajaia continued his successful campaign in France and Czech Republic on Paul Ricard and Brno circuits respectively by winning all races in TC2T and being in top 3 across the line against dominant Seat Single Make Trophy cars in all races. He led the second race against Seats in Brno but could not hold on to his lead due to power disadvantage of his TC2T class car on uphill sections of the track and had to settle for 3rd across the line (nevertheless he won in the TC2T class dully). Kajaia suggested after the race that he might have won outright had he not left his rain settings on after the early shower. His winning streak was only interrupted on Zolder, in Belgium where he took pole position on the wet track and led the whole race 1 before a mechanical failure denied him the obvious win 3 laps from the end. During the second race Kajaia went off the track and had to settle for second in TC2T. For the last round in Pergusa, Italy he also had to compete against Franz Engstler (owner of his team) in a sister BMW TC2T. During the first race he chased Petr Fulin in a Seat for the outright win but could not close in sufficiently to attack the Czech driver in a superior single make machinery. His win in TC2T was enough to secure him the 2015 title regardless of the results of the race 2. During the race 2 both Engstler Motorsport cars made an excellent start from a reversed grid. After a couple of overtakes Kajaia ultimately found himself second overall behind Engstler's leading TC2T BMW. Kajaia pushed his teammate hard, closing down on the German and putting pressure on him for the last several laps but could not find the way past and had to settle for second. Kajaia received his ETCC trophy during the FIA 2015 Motorsport awards held in December 2015.

Career summary

Complete TCR International Series results
(key) (Races in bold indicate pole position) (Races in italics indicate fastest lap)

† Driver did not finish the race, but was classified as he completed over 75% of the race distance.

Complete TCR Europe Touring Car Series results
(key) (Races in bold indicate pole position) (Races in italics indicate fastest lap)

† Driver did not finish the race, but was classified as he completed over 90% of the race distance.

References

External links
 Data Kajaia at the Drivers Database
 European Nations Cup Official website
 Rustavi International Motorpark
 Euro Nations Cup Entry List
 Georgian AutoSport Association Licensed Drivers

1984 births
Living people
Sportspeople from Tbilisi
Georgian racing drivers
TCR International Series drivers
European Touring Car Cup drivers
Engstler Motorsport drivers
TCR Europe Touring Car Series drivers